The following is a list of squads for each national team competing at the 2016 AFC U-23 Championship, The tournament took place during January 2016 in Qatar. It was the second U-23 age group competition organised by the Asian Football Confederation. As the tournament was not held during the FIFA International Match Calendar, clubs were not obligated to release the players.

Each team had to submit 23 players in their national team squads. The full squad listings are below.

Players in boldface have been capped at full international level at some point in their career.

Group A

Qatar

Head coach:  Félix Sánchez Bas

Syria

Head coach: Muhannad Al Fakir

Iran

Head coach: Mohammad Khakpour

China

Head coach: Fu Bo

Group B

Saudi Arabia
Head coach:  Adrie Koster

Japan
Head coach: Makoto Teguramori

North Korea

Head coach: Yun Jong-su

Thailand

Head coach: Kiatisuk Senamuang

Squad announced on 29 December 2015.

Group C

Iraq

Head coach: Abdul Ghani Shahad

South Korea
Head coach: Shin Tae-yong

Squad announced on 27 December 2015.

Uzbekistan
Head coach: Samvel Babayan

Yemen

Head coach: Amin Al-Sanini

Group D

Jordan

Head coach: Jamal Abu-Abed

Australia

Head coach: Aurelio Vidmar

United Arab Emirates

Head coach: Abdullah Mesfer

Vietnam

Head coach:  Toshiya Miura

References

2016 AFC U-23 Championship